The Measure of a Man is a 2015 French drama film directed by Stéphane Brizé. It was selected to compete for the Palme d'Or at the 2015 Cannes Film Festival. At Cannes, Vincent Lindon won the award for Best Actor and the film won a commendation awarded by the Ecumenical Jury.

Plot
Thierry has been unemployed for 18 months, having lost his job as a factory worker. At the age of 51, he lands a new job as a security guard in a supermarket. However, he must spy on his co-workers at the behest of his boss.

Cast

 Vincent Lindon as Thierry Taugourdeau
 Yves Ory as Employment agency counsellor
 Karine De Mirbeck as Thierry’s wife
 Matthieu Schaller as Thierry’s son
 Xavier Mathieu as Union colleague
 Noël Mairot as Dance teacher
 Catherine Saint-Bonnet as banker

Reception

Critical reception

On review aggregator website Rotten Tomatoes, the film holds a "certified fresh" approval rating of 91% based on 57 reviews, and an average rating of 7.4/10. The website's critical consensus reads, "With The Measure of a Man, director/co-writer Stéphane Brizé uses one man's heartrending story as a beautifully acted microcosm for life in the 21st-century global economy." On Metacritic, the film has a weighted average score of 74 out of 100, based on 19 critics, indicating "generally favorable reviews".

Accolades

References

External links
 

2015 films
2015 drama films
2010s French-language films
French drama films
Films directed by Stéphane Brizé
Films featuring a Best Actor Lumières Award-winning performance
Films featuring a Best Actor César Award-winning performance
2010s French films